Albert Tobias Clay (December 4, 1866 – September 14, 1925) was an American professor, historian and Semitic linguist. He was professor of Assyriology and Babylonian Literature at Yale University and served as founding curator of the Yale Babylonian Collection.

Background
Albert Tobias Clay was born at Hanover in York County, Pennsylvania. He graduated from Franklin and Marshall College in Lancaster, Pennsylvania during 1889 and from the Lutheran Theological Seminary at Gettysburg in 1892. He was subsequently ordained into the Lutheran ministry.

Career
Clay went on the become a teaching fellow in Assyrian and instructor in the Hebrew language at the University of Pennsylvania.  In 1895–99, he returned as lecturer in Semitic archaeology after being an instructor in Old Testament theology at the Chicago Lutheran Seminary. He was assistant professor of Semitic philology and archaeology 1903–09 and full professor for one year.

In 1910, Clay became the William M. Laffan Professor of Assyriology and Babylonian Literature at Yale University. In 1909, J. Pierpont Morgan funded the founding of the Yale Babylonian Collection at Yale University. Clay served as its first curator, a position which he held until his death in 1925.

He served as Librarian of the American Oriental Society from 1913 to 1924 and as its president in 1924–25.  He first visited Iraq in 1920, and returned in 1923 as the Commissioner for the American Schools of Oriental Research (ASOR) to formally open the Society school in Baghdad. He remained as its first annual Visiting Professor and Deputy Director (1923–24).

Selected works
His most important publications were Babylonian business and legal documents, especially Business Documents of Murashû Sons of Nippur (1898; et seq).  Amurru, the Home of the Northern Semites (1909) shows the non-Babylonian origin of Israelite culture and religion. Other notable works included The empire of the Amorites (1919), An old Babylonian version of the Gilgamesh epic (1920), A Hebrew deluge story in cuneiform (1922) and The origin of Biblical traditions (1923).

Personal life
Albert T. Clay was married to Elizabeth Somerville McCafferty	(1867–1936). They were the parents of Albert born in 1898 and Barbara born in 1905.

References

Note

External links
 
 

1866 births
1925 deaths
American archaeologists
American Assyriologists
20th-century American Lutheran clergy
20th-century American historians
20th-century American male writers
19th-century American historians
19th-century American male writers
Linguists from the United States
Old Testament scholars
American orientalists
Franklin & Marshall College alumni
People from Hanover, Pennsylvania
University of Pennsylvania faculty
American male non-fiction writers
19th-century American Lutheran clergy
Assyriologists